La Prevoyante (1970–1974) was a Canadian-bred thoroughbred race horse elected to the Racing Halls of Fame in the United States and Canada.

Background
La Prevoyante was bred and owned by Jean-Louis Lévesque. Her sire was Buckpasser, a son of Tom Fool.

Racing career

1972: two-year-old season
Racing in the United States at age two, La Prevoyante went undefeated, winning all 12 starts under jockey John LeBlanc en route to the 1972 Eclipse Award as American Champion Two-Year-Old Filly   and the Sovereign Award as the Canadian Horse of the Year.  In a rare occurrence, two two-year-olds topped the balloting for 1972 American Horse of the Year honours with Secretariat edging out La Prevoyante. Secretariat received the votes of the Thoroughbred Racing Associations of North America and the Daily Racing Form, while La Prevoyante was chosen by the National Turf Writers Association.

1973: three-year-old season
As a 3-year-old, La Prevoyante did not achieve the same success.  She lost for the first time in her initial start, finishing second in a six-furlong race at Gulfstream Park.  She took another second in the 1973 Kentucky Oaks and was third in the Canadian Oaks.

Her French Canadian owner brought La Prevoyante to his hometown of Montreal, Quebec where she won the Quebec Derby at Blue Bonnets Raceway.  Although the betting favorite, on a muddy track she finished well back in the 1973 Queen's Plate at Woodbine Racetrack in Toronto, Ontario.

1974: four-year-old season
In 1974, she won three consecutive sprint races at the Saratoga Race Course.  Following the December 28, 1974 Miss Florida Handicap at the Tropical-at-Calder meet, La Prevoyante collapsed in the unsaddling area.  She got back on her feet and was able to walk to the stables but collapsed again and died of a ruptured lung.

Honours
La Prevoyante was part of the inaugural class of inductees in the Canadian Horse Racing Hall of Fame. She was inducted into the United States National Museum of Racing and Hall of Fame in 1995.

Pedigree

References 

1970 racehorse births
1974 racehorse deaths
Racehorses bred in Canada
Racehorses trained in Canada
Thoroughbred family 2-d
Eclipse Award winners
Canadian Champion racehorses
Canadian Thoroughbred Horse of the Year
Canadian Horse Racing Hall of Fame inductees
United States Thoroughbred Racing Hall of Fame inductees